Indian Institute of Information Technology, Kalyani (IIIT Kalyani) is an Indian Institute of Information Technology located at Kalyani, West Bengal. The institute was set up by the Government of India Ministry of Human Resource Development, Government of West Bengal and industry partners (Coal India and Rolta) using the not-for-profit Public Private Partnership (N-PPP) model, at a ratio of 50:35:15 respectively between three parties. Admission to IIIT Kalyani is done on the basis of the marks obtained in JEE Main.IIIT Kalyani has been attributed the status of Institute of National Importance (INI) by the cabinet in March 2017 under the IIIT Act. The institute is run by the Board of Governors of IIIT Kalyani whose members include the representatives of Government of India (MHRD), Government of West Bengal, industry partners and eminent people from academia, industry and civil society. Virendra Kumar Tewari (Director, IIT Kharagpur) is the Mentor-Director for IIIT, Kalyani and IIT Kharagpur is the mentor institute.
Prof. Santanu Chattopadhyay has taken charge as the Director of the Institute on December 16, 2020.

History 

The classes started from the first week of July 2014 under the mentorship of IIEST Shibpur, from the temporary campus located at the campus of JIS College of Engineering. On 19 August 2014, the official inauguration of the institute was done by the former mentor director Ajoy Kumar Ray, the director of IIEST Shibpur. The mentorship was passed on to IIT Kharagpur in 2017 and the institute has since been operating from a transit campus at Webel IT Park.

Campus 
On Jun 30, 2015 Hon'ble Chief Minister, Mamata Banerjee  laid the foundation stone of  the Indian Institute of Information Technology (IIIT) campus in Kalyani.The campus will be built on 50 acres on Kalyani Expressway on the outskirts of Kalyani town.

References

External links 

Kalyani
Universities and colleges in Nadia district
Kalyani, West Bengal
Educational institutions established in 2014
2014 establishments in West Bengal